The Italian city of Naples has a number of museums.

List
An incomplete brief list of museums in Naples:

References

 
Naples - Museums
Naples
Museums